Terra Markets AS (formerly known as Orion Securities AS) is a Norwegian investment banking firm in the Norne Securities group.  Terra Markets employs 75 professionals in brokerage, equity research, market making and corporate finance. The equity research team consists of 15 analysts who cover approximately 150 listed companies in Norway. The team have a particularly strong coverage of small and midcap companies on the Oslo Stock Exchange, and have a strong track record in the Norwegian market. Among achievements can be mentioned that Terra Markets has won the expert competition Børsspeilet in Økonomisk Rapport seven eight in a row. Terra Markets is a member of the stock exchanges in Oslo.

History
 In 2009, Terra Group acquired the investment firm Orion Securities AS, and later changed its name to Terra Markets AS.
In 2012, Terra Markets was acquired by Norne Securities AS

References

Financial services companies of Norway
Companies based in Oslo
Banks established in 1999
1999 establishments in Norway